Last Letter may refer to:

 Last Letter (2018 film)
 Last Letter (2020 film)
 The Last Letter, song by Rex Griffin